The American Bar Association (ABA) is a voluntary bar association of lawyers and law students; it is not specific to any jurisdiction in the United States. Founded in 1878, the ABA's stated activities are the setting of academic standards for law schools, and the formulation of model ethical codes related to the legal profession. As of fiscal year 2017, the ABA had 194,000 dues-paying members, constituting approximately 14.4% of American attorneys. In 1979, half of all lawyers in the U.S. were members of the ABA. The organization's national headquarters are in Chicago, Illinois, and it also maintains a significant branch office in Washington, D.C.

History

The ABA was founded on August 21, 1878, in Saratoga Springs, New York, by 75 lawyers from 20 states and the District of Columbia. According to the ABA website:

The purpose of the original organization, as set forth in its first constitution, was "the advancement of the science of jurisprudence, the promotion of the administration of justice and a uniformity of legislation throughout the country...."

In 1918, the first women were admitted to the ABA – Judge Mary Belle Grossman of Cleveland and Mary Florence Lathrop of Denver.

The ABA did not have any African-American members and its discrimination led to the formation in 1937 of the National Lawyers Guild. The ABA denied admittance to Francis E. Rivers in 1943 and several prominent members threatened to quit as a result and the organization was finally integrated.

The ABA appointed Jill Wine-Banks as its first woman executive director, who served from 1987 to 1990. Roberta Cooper Ramo was the first female President of the ABA from 1995 to 1996.

In 2016 ABA introduced a new ethics rule prohibiting attorneys from using sexist, racist and condescending terms.  The rule also prohibits attorneys from engaging in discrimination based on age in the conduct of bar association activities.

On May 1, 2019, the ABA launched a new membership model aimed at reversing declining membership and revenue.  As mentioned in "Criticisms," below, and despite ABA's own rule against age-discriminatory conduct, the "experience-based" component of the ABA dues structure is a proxy for age discrimination, imposing significantly higher dues on lawyers as their years in practice increase.

Leadership and governance
The ABA adopts "policy" (organizational positions) on certain legislative and national issues, as voted on by its elected, 589-member House of Delegates. Its Board of Governors, with 44 members, has the authority to act for the ABA, consistent with previous action of the House of Delegates, when the House is not in session.

The ABA president, elected to a one-year term, is chief executive officer of the association, while the appointed, longer-serving executive director works as chief operating officer. The conclusion of the ABA Annual Meeting, in August, is when a new president takes office, as well as when the main sessions of the House of Delegates take place. The Annual Meeting also gives the general membership the opportunity to participate in educational programs and hear speakers address many issues.

In 2010, Jack L. Rives, formerly TJAG (The Judge Advocate General of the Air Force), was appointed executive director and chief operating officer(COO).

Model ethical standards for lawyers 

One function of the ABA is its creation and maintenance of a code of ethical standards for lawyers. The Model Code of Professional Responsibility (1969) and/or the newer Model Rules of Professional Conduct (1983) have been adopted in 49 states, the District of Columbia and the United States Virgin Islands. The exception is the State Bar of California; however, a few sections of the California Rules of Professional Conduct were drawn from the ABA models.

Accreditation of U.S. law schools since 1923 
The United States Department of Education recognises the Council of the ABA Section on Legal Education and Admissions to the Bar as a professional accrediting agency for law schools in the U.S. American law schools that are accredited by the council are termed "approved" by the ABA, which indicates the law school was found to be in compliance with ABA accreditation standards.

ABA accreditation is important not only because it affects the recognition of the law schools involved, but it also affects a graduate's ability to practice law in a particular state. Specifically, in most U.S. jurisdictions, graduation from an ABA-accredited law school is  prerequisite towards being allowed to sit for that state's bar exam, and even for existing lawyers to be admitted to the bar of another state upon motion. Even states which recognize unaccredited schools within their borders will generally not recognize such schools from other jurisdictions for purposes of bar admission.

For law students attending ABA-accredited schools, memberships are available for free.  Students attending non-ABA accredited law schools are permitted to join the ABA as associate members.

In November 2022, the ABA Legal Education and Admissions to the Bar Council voted to eliminate its accreditation requirement that law schools in the United States require prospective students submit results on the LSAT or an alternative valid and reliable standardized admissions test (while continuing to permit law schools to require them of their own accord).

Accreditation process criticisms 
The ABA accreditation process has been widely criticized for failing to ensure that law schools are disclosing accurate post-graduate statistics which may mislead students regarding the post-graduate job market, especially in light of ever-growing student loan debt. There are heated debates over requirements placed on law schools by the ABA. Many states and practitioners believe ABA requirements to be unnecessary, costly, outdated and lacking innovation. Some legal professionals and academics feel these requirements promote the rising cost of tuition. The collision of attorney layoffs in 2009, the glut of fresh non-top-tier law graduates without work, and the continued expansion of law schools raised questions on whether the ABA has been too lenient in its accreditation process.

A non-profit organization, Law School Transparency, called upon the ABA to provide meaningful statistics regarding the employment prospects and salary information of graduates of ABA accredited institutions. In 2011 and 2012, the ABA updated its accreditation process to include penalties and possible loss of accreditation for schools that misrepresented their graduates' employment data, as well as, greatly expanded the information required from accredited laws schools regarding student bar-passage rates and post-graduate employment. Despite the ongoing controversy surrounding law school accreditation standards and inability of law school graduates to effectively service their educational debt, the ABA continued to approve new law schools.

Since 2014, the ABA has required law schools to disclose more information about their applicants and graduates. Required information now includes such information as admissions data, tuition and fees, living costs, conditional scholarships, enrollment data, numbers of full‐time and part‐time faculty, class sizes for first‐year and upper‐class courses, employment outcomes and bar passage data. The 205 ABA-approved law schools reported that, 10 months after graduation, 28,029 graduates of the class of 2015, or 70 percent, were employed in long-term, full-time positions where bar passage is required or a J.D. is preferred.

In May 2019, the ABA Council of the Section of Legal Education and Admissions to the Bar changed the requirement for graduate bar passage rates. Previously, to remain accredited, schools had to have a 75% bar passage rate for students within 5 years of graduation, with various ways to meet this standard and no law schools having ever been found in violation of the rule. The new rule requires the 75% bar passage rate be achieved within 2 years with no exceptions.  The change was passed by the Section despite failing a vote in the ABA House of Delegates twice. Proponents of the change say the increased standard will ensure students are better prepared for passing the bar and for legal practice in general with less students acquiring large student debt without reasonable job opportunities. Opponents claim this will adversely affect diversity in law schools, which will be forced to increase their admissions standards and required LSAT scores, which in turn will disproportionately affect minority applicants. Under the new plan, 14 schools will be at risk of losing their accreditation if their bar-passage rates do not improve within two years. At the time of the rule change, three law schools were currently in the process of closing, and another school was under probation. In June 2019, the ABA voted to revoke the accreditation of Thomas Jefferson School of Law in San Diego, California.

Antitrust consent decree and contempt fine
In 1995 the United States Department of Justice accused the ABA of violating Section 1 of the Sherman Act in its law school accreditation proceedings. The case was resolved with a consent decree. In 2006, the ABA acknowledged that it violated the consent decree and paid DOJ a $185,000 fine.

Continuing legal education

The American Bar Association Center for Continuing Legal Education (ABA-CLE) serves as the central CLE resource for the ABA. It is overseen by the ABA Standing Committee on Continuing Legal Education and works closely with experts from the ABA Sections and the profession at large. In addition to its own distribution, the ABA-CLE is also delivered via private, non-profit CLE organizations, such as Practising Law Institute and for-profit organizations, such as West LegalEdCenter.

Publications 
Association

The Association publishes a monthly general magazine circulated to all members, the ABA Journal (since 1984, formerly American Bar Association Journal, 1915–1983), now also online.

Sections, divisions and forums
ABA members may also join practice setting or subject-specific "sections," "divisions", or "forums," and each entity publishes a variety of newsletters and magazines for its members (such as Law Practice Magazine published by the Law Practice Division; GPSolo Magazine published by the Solo, Small Firm and General Practice Division and
Probate and Property Magazine published by the Real Property, Trust and Estate Law)
). Some of these magazines, such as the Business Law Section's "Business Law Today," are available on-line to non-members. The first such journal was the Annual Bulletin of the Comparative Law Bureau, the first comparative law journal in the U.S. (1908–1914). The entities also hold their own meetings, such as the annual Solo Day.

Each entity typically has a publication program that includes (1) books, usually oriented toward practitioners; (2) scholarly journals, such as Administrative Law Review (published by the ABA Section of Administrative Law & Regulatory Practice and The American University Washington College of Law) and The International Lawyer (published by the ABA Section of International Law and SMU Dedman School of Law); (3) newsletters, such as The International Law News (published by the ABA Section of International Law); (4) e-publications, such as a monthly message from the section chair, or updates on substantive law developments; and (5) committee publications, such as a committee newsletter published by one of the substantive law committees.

Commissions 

The ABA's Commission on Sexual Orientation and Gender Identity was established in 2007.

The ABA's Criminal Justice Section, specifically the Corrections Committee, focuses on the United States Criminal Justice System and its surrounding laws, policies, and structure. The Corrections Committee "is pushing to provide greater assistance ... for those reentering society" from prison by pushing law schools and state bar associations to provide opportunities for law students to represent prisoners reentering society.

In 2017, the ABA's Commission on Women in the Profession released "A Current Glance at Women in the Law", providing research about the status of women in the American legal profession. The report showed a 6 percent increase in women attorneys over the last decade, with women currently making up 36 percent of the legal profession. Law schools award 47.3 percent of J.D.s to women, which has been consistent for the past 10 years. In private practice law firms, women make up less than 22 percent of partners, a 4.2 percent increase over the last 10 years. In the last decade, there has been a significant growth rate of women in the role of general counsel in Fortune 500 companies, but still women only represent 24.8 percent of Fortune 500 general counsels.

Positions on social and legal issues

Policies on LGBT people
In 2011, the ABA's House of Delegates passed an anti-bullying resolution that included sexual orientation and gender identity among characteristics that should be protected, along with race, religion, national origin, sex, and disability.

At the 2013 annual meeting, the ABA's House of Delegates passed a resolution that made it harder for criminal defense lawyers to use the LGBT panic defense, which argues that a crime victim's sexual orientation should mitigate the defendant's guilt.

At the 2014 annual meeting, the ABA passed Resolution 114B, which stated that "lesbian, gay, bisexual, and transgender (LGBT) people have a human right to be free from discrimination, threats, and violence based on their LGBT status," and called on the governments of countries where such discriminatory laws exist to repeal them.

Mandatory sentencing requirements

A hearing in 2009 heard testimony from the ABA which stated that "Sentencing by mandatory minimums is the antithesis of rational sentencing policy". In 2004 the association called for the repeal of mandatory minimum sentences, stating that "there is no need for mandatory minimum sentences in a guided sentencing system."

Presidential signing statements
In July 2006, an ABA task force under ABA president, then Michael S. Greco, released a report that concluded that George W. Bush's use of "signing statements" violates the Constitution. These are documents attached by the President when signing bills, in which the President states that he or she will enforce the new law only to the extent that he or she feels the law conforms to the proper interpretation of the Constitution.

Same sex marriage
At the 2010 annual meeting, the ABA passed Resolution 111 urging every state, territorial, and tribal government to eliminate legal barriers to civil marriage between two persons of the same sex who are otherwise eligible to marry.

Rating of judicial nominees
For decades, the ABA has participated in the federal judicial nomination process by vetting nominees and giving them a rating ranging from "not qualified" to "well qualified". According to a compendium of those ratings, the ABA's Committee on the Federal Judiciary began rating Supreme Court nominees in 1956, but: "At various points in its history, the committee altered its ratings categories, making comparisons across time difficult."

The committee consists of two members from the ninth judicial circuit, one member from each of the other federal judicial circuits and the chair of the committee. The ABA's Board of Governors, House of Delegates and officers are not involved with the work of the committee, and it is completely insulated from the rest of the ABA's activities, including its policies. Although the committee rates prospective nominees, it does not propose, recommend or endorse candidates for nomination to the federal judiciary, as that would compromise its independent evaluative function.

The committee works in strictly-enforced confidentiality, typically evaluating around 60 nominees per year. Nominees are rated as "well qualified", "qualified" or "not qualified". If the president selects a prospective nominee, the committee chair notifies the White House, the Department of Justice, the members of the Senate Judiciary Committee and the nominee of the committee's rating.

There are several procedural differences between the committee's investigations of Supreme Court nominees and those of lower courts, notably that investigations of Supreme Court nominees are conducted after the president has submitted a nomination. Also, there is added scrutiny with Supreme Court nominees, such as teams of law professors examining the legal writings of the prospective justice.

The process has been alleged by some (including the Federalist Society) to have a liberal bias. For example, the ABA gave Ronald Reagan's judicial nominees Richard Posner and Frank H. Easterbrook low "qualified/not qualified" ratings; later, the ABA gave Bill Clinton judicial nominees with similar resumes "well qualified" ratings. Meanwhile, Judges Posner and Easterbrook have gone on to become the two most highly cited judges in the federal appellate judiciary.

In 2001, the George W. Bush administration announced that it would cease submitting names to the ABA in advance of judicial nominations. The ABA continued to rate nominees, just not before the names were released publicly. During the Obama administration, the ABA was once again given advance notice of judicial nominees for rating. President Trump returned to George W. Bush's policy of not giving the ABA advanced notice of judicial nominees. Seven of George W. Bush's nominees received a 'not qualified' ranking, four of Clinton's nominees, zero of Obama's nominees, and, through December 2018, six of Trump's nominees were rated 'not qualified'. For recent U.S. Supreme Court nominees, Chief Justice John G. Roberts Jr., Justice Samuel Alito, Justice Ruth Bader Ginsburg, Justice Elena Kagan, Justice Neil Gorsuch, Brett Kavanaugh, and Amy Coney Barrett all received the same "well qualified" rating.

In 2001 a study "found that nominees confirmed to the federal appeals courts with prior judicial experience fared about the same before the bar association whether they were nominated by the first President George Bush or President Bill Clinton. But ... 'among those without prior judicial experience, the differences were stark: 65 percent of Clinton nominees received the A.B.A.'s highest rating compared to 17 percent of Bush nominees.'" In 2012, a study was released in Political Research Quarterly showing that from 1977 to 2008 there was a distinct bias in favor of judicial candidates nominated by a Democratic president, with all other factors being equal. Candidates nominated by a Democratic president were 15 percent more likely to receive a "well qualified" ranking than a similarly qualified candidate nominated by a Republican president. Supporters of the rating system argue that nominees rated 'not qualified' will not perform as well as judges, however, a 2010 study found "a review of tens of thousands of dispositions does not provide generally persuasive evidence that judges rated by the ABA as Well Qualified perform better."

Nominee ratings during the Trump administration 
The ABA judicial nominee rating process drew additional attention during the Trump administration. Through June 2019, six of President Trump's nominees were rated "not qualified." Three of those were ranked unanimously not qualified, which had only occurred twice previously since the George H. W. Bush administration. These ratings added further fuel to conservatives' arguments of bias in the nominee rating process. Republicans argued that members of the Committee on the Federal Judiciary have allowed their personal liberal political leanings to influence their ratings under the category of judicial temperament.

Members of the committee were accused of asking inappropriate questions of a nominee regarding abortion and negatively referring to Republicans as "you people." Senator Ted Cruz stated that the ABA is a liberal advocacy group and, as such, "should not be treated as a fair or impartial arbiter of merit." Senator Ben Sasse also criticized the organization for taking liberal stances on issues then proclaiming to be neutral when evaluating judicial nominees. The ABA said "evaluation of these candidates does not consider the nominees' politics, their ideology or their party affiliation and has found unqualified candidates put forth by both political parties."

Criticisms
The ABA has been criticized for racism. In 1925, African-American lawyers formed the National Bar Association at a time when the ABA would not allow them to be members. Currently, the National Bar Association has over 60,000 members and 84 chapters.

Since the onset of twenty-first century, the ABA has increased the diversity of its membership and leadership. Dennis Archer, who served as ABA president from 2003 to 2004, was the first African American to hold the position, while Paulette Brown, 2015–2016, was the association's first president who is a woman of color. Steve Zack, whose term was in 2010 and 2011, was the first Cuban American to hold the American Bar Association's presidency.

In 2016, for the first time, the ABA had an all-female roster of officers, including two African Americans and one Native American: Linda A. Klein (president), Hilarie Bass (president-elect), Deborah Enix-Ross (chair of the House of Delegates), Mary L. Smith (secretary), Michelle A. Behnke (treasurer) and Paulette Brown (immediate past president).

In recent years, the ABA has also drawn some criticism, mainly from the conservative side of the political spectrum, for taking positions on controversial public policy topics such as abortion, gun control, and same-sex marriage. The ABA's official position in favor of abortion rights led to the formation of an alternative organization for lawyers in 1993, the National Lawyers for Life, now the National Lawyers Association. The Federalist Society previously sponsored a twice-a-year publication called "ABA Watch" that reports on the political activities of the ABA.

Writing for Forbes, Mark A. Cohen criticized the ABA for failing to keep the practice of law in America up with the changing demands of modern society. Cohen also criticized the ABA for opposing regulatory reform that would help increase access to affordable legal services for those in need and for engaging in protectionism when some legal services could be performed by paralegals and other non-lawyer professionals at a lower cost. Eighty percent of Americans cannot afford legal services and the ABA has failed to embrace alternative legal delivery methods that could address this problem.

The ABA also failed to address rules that prohibit some online legal referral websites when it updated the Model Rules regarding Communication Concerning a Lawyer's Services.

Recent ABA presidents 

 2003–2004: Dennis W. Archer (first African-American male president)
 2004–2005: Robert J. Grey, Jr.
 2005–2006: Michael S. Greco (first foreign-born president)
 2006–2007: Karen J. Mathis
 2007–2008: William H. Neukom
 2008–2009: H. Thomas Wells, Jr.
 2009–2010: Carolyn B. Lamm
 2010-2011: Stephen N. Zack (first Hispanic American president)
 2011–2012: Wm. T. (Bill) Robinson III
 2012–2013: Laurel G. Bellows
 2013–2014: James R. Silkenat
 2014–2015: William C. Hubbard
 2015–2016: Paulette Brown (first African-American female president)
 2016–2017: Linda Klein
 2017–2018: Hilarie Bass
 2018–2019: Bob Carlson
 2019–2020: Judy Perry Martinez
 2020–2021: Patricia Lee Refo
 2021–2022: Reginald M. Turner
 2022-2023: Deborah Enix-Ross

Annual meeting 
Each year in August, the ABA holds an annual meeting in different cities that consists of speeches, CLE classes, gatherings, and the ABA EXPO. At the meeting, the recipient of the association's highest honor, the American Bar Association Medal, is announced.

See also

 ABA digital signature guidelines
 ABA Model Rules of Professional Conduct
 American Constitution Society
 Association of American Law Schools
 Attorney at law (United States)
 Bar Association
 Bar (law)
 Federalist Society
 Law practice
 Law practice management
 Law School Admission Council
 National Lawyers Guild
 Solosez, an electronic mailing list sponsored and hosted by the American Bar Association
 Union Internationale des Avocats

References

External links 
 
 
 American Bar Association FBI Files on the Internet Archive

 
American bar associations
Legal organizations in Chicago
Organizations established in 1878
School accreditors
School accreditors in Chicago
1878 establishments in New York (state)
Non-profit organizations based in Chicago
Professional associations based in Chicago